Julien Martinelli (born 12 December 1980) is a French former professional footballer who played as a goalkeeper.

Career 
Martinelli made 3 appearances in Ligue 2 with Chamois Niortais.

References

External links
Yahoo! Sport profile

1980 births
Living people
People from Schiltigheim
French footballers
RC Strasbourg Alsace players
Chamois Niortais F.C. players
Angoulême Charente FC players
Angers SCO players
Association football goalkeepers
Footballers from Alsace
Sportspeople from Bas-Rhin